The 2013–14 Central Michigan Chippewas men's basketball team represented Central Michigan University during the 2013–14 NCAA Division I men's basketball season. The Chippewas, led by second year head coach Keno Davis, played their home games at the McGuirk Arena as members of the West Division of the Mid-American Conference. They finished the season 10–21, 3–15 in MAC play to finish in fifth place in the West Division. They lost in the first round of the MAC tournament to Eastern Michigan.

Season

Preseason
Head coach Keno Davis announced the Chippewas' season schedule on September 3, 2013. The main highlight of the schedule was the first ever Central Michigan Tournament, with Montana State, Austin Peay, and Cal State Northridge participating. The Chippewas also schedule to visit Atlantic 10 squad Dayton. For the conference schedule, the Chippewas scheduled home-and-home series with Ball State, Eastern Michigan, Northern Illinois, Toledo, Western Michigan, Miami, and Kent State, while hosting Buffalo and Akron and visiting Ohio and Bowling Green.

November
The Chippewas opened the regular season on November 8, 2013, with a dominating win over Division III opponent Manchester. John Simons scored 27 points to lead the Chippewas to a 101–49 victory.

Roster

Schedule and results
Source: 

|-
!colspan=9 style="background:#660033; color:#FFCC00;"| Exhibition

|-
!colspan=9 style="background:#660033; color:#FFCC00;"| Non-conference games

|-
!colspan=9 style="background:#660033; color:#FFCC00;"| Conference games

|-
!colspan=9 style="background:#660033; color:#FFCC00;"| 2014 MAC tournament

See also
 2013–14 NCAA Division I men's basketball season	
 2013–14 NCAA Division I men's basketball rankings

References

Central Michigan
Central Michigan Chippewas men's basketball seasons